The Journal of Fish Biology covers all aspects of fish and fisheries biological research, both freshwater and marine. It is published by Wiley-Blackwell and is the official journal of the Fisheries Society of the British Isles.

External links 

 
 Homepage of The Fisheries Society of the British Isles

Ichthyology journals
Publications established in 1969
Monthly journals
English-language journals
Wiley-Blackwell academic journals